Yaps and Yokels is a 1919 American silent comedy film featuring Oliver Hardy.

Cast
 Jimmy Aubrey as James
 Oliver Hardy as The Hired Hand (as Babe Hardy)
 Richard Smith as The Father (as Dick Smith)

See also
 List of American films of 1919
 Oliver Hardy filmography

External links

1919 films
Silent American comedy films
American silent short films
American black-and-white films
1919 comedy films
1919 short films
Films directed by Noel M. Smith
American comedy short films
1910s American films